The International Conference on Austroasiatic Linguistics (ICAAL) is an annual academic conference that focuses on research in Austroasiatic languages and linguistics.

History
The first ICAAL conference was held at the University of Hawaiʻi in Honolulu, Hawaii, United States on the first week of January in 1973. After 1979, conferences were no longer held for over 25 years as much of Southeast Asia was inaccessible to Western researchers during many of those years.

On August 30, 2001, in Périgueux, France, interest in reviving ICAAL was rekindled when Gérard Diffloth, Michel Ferlus, and George van Driem met to discuss the history and potential future of ICAAL. They then went on to host the ICAAL 3 Pilot Meeting in June 2006 at Siem Reap, Cambodia, which was funded by the Dutch Research Council and the École française d'Extrême-Orient. The ICAAL 3 academic conference was held at the Deccan College Post-Graduate and Research Institute in Pune, India in November 2007, and conferences have since been held biannually. In 2011, ICAAL 5 was scheduled to be held from November 9–11, 2011, at Mahidol University in Bangkok, Thailand, but the conference was cancelled due to the 2011 Thailand floods. ICAAL 5 was thus postponed to 2013 and held at the Australian National University.

List of meetings
A full list of meetings, including full conferences, workshops, and other meetings, are as follows.

Proceedings
Conference proceedings:

Second International Conference on Austroasiatic Linguistics (SICAL). (Archived mss)
Papers from the Helsingør symposium on Austroasiatic linguistics and literature. (Archived mss)
Nagaraja, K.S., and Kashyap Mankodi. 2007. Austroasiatic linguistics: proceedings of Third International Conference of Austroasiatic Linguistics, November 26–28, 2007. Mysore: Central Institute of Indian Languages, Mysore.

See also
List of linguistics conferences

References

External links
 (icaal.net)
Archives of ICAAL 3–6 (icaal.org)

Linguistics conferences